Anikó Krisztina Németh (born 6 September 1996) is a Hungarian ice hockey goaltender and member of the Hungarian national ice hockey team, currently playing with the women's representative team of MAC Budapest in the European Women's Hockey League (EWHL).

Playing career
Németh has represented Hungary at nine IIHF World Women's Championships – twice at the Division II A level, three times at the Division I B level, three times at the Division I A level, and at the Top Division tournament in 2021. With the Hungarian national under-18 team, she participated in the IIHF Women's U18 World Championships in 2013 and 2014.

Personal life 
Németh's twin sister, Bernadett, is an ice hockey defenseman and also plays with the Hungarian national team and MAC Budapest.

Career statistics

International 

Source(s):

Awards and honors

References

External links 
 

Living people
1996 births
Hungarian expatriate sportspeople in Canada
Hungarian women's ice hockey goaltenders
Ice hockey people from Budapest
KMH Budapest (women) players
MAC Budapest (women) players
Hungarian twins
Twin sportspeople
European Women's Hockey League players